John Hay (June 26, 1862 – January 16, 1925) was a Canadian politician.

Born in Chatham, Canada East, Hay was a farmer. He was mayor of Lachute from 1907 to 1909. He ran unsuccessfully for the Legislative Assembly of Quebec in the riding of Argenteuil in 1892. He was elected in a 1910 by-election and was defeated in 1912. A Liberal, he was elected in 1916 and served until his death in 1925 in Lachute.

References

1862 births
1925 deaths
People from Chatham-Kent
Quebec Liberal Party MNAs